Germán Sánchez Hernández-Cobos (7 July 1927 – 12 January 2015) was a prolific Spanish actor in a variety of European films. He was married to Visitación Peralta.

Selected filmography

 The Lioness of Castille (1951) 
 Flight 971 (1953) - Primer oficial
 Judas' Kiss (1954) - Andrés (uncredited)
 La patrulla (1954) - Calatayud
 The Other Life of Captain Contreras (1955) - Pedro
 Marta (1955)
 Mañana cuando amanezca (1955)
 La vida es maravillosa (1956) - Eugenio Jalón
 Return to the Truth (1956) - Carlos
 Cuerda de presos (1956) - Silvestre
 Torrepartida (1956) - Manuel
 Le schiave di Cartagine (1956) - Tullius
 Roberto el diablo (1957) - Roberto
 Saranno uomini (1957)
 The Star of Africa (1957)
 Susanna Whipped Cream (1957) - Alberto
 Femmine tre volte (1957) - IMDb Ugo
 The Lady Doctor (1957) - Avv. Otello Bellomo
 El ángel está en la cumbre (1958) - Carlos Valle
 Soledad (1959) - Paco
 A Girl Against Napoleon (1959) - Lucas
 Ama Rosa (1960) - Javier
 One Step Forward (1960) - Rafael Aguirre
 Los abanderados de la Providencia (1960)
 At Five O'Clock in the Afternoon (1960) - José Álvarez
 Taxi for Tobruk (1961) - Jean Ramirez
 El amor empieza en sábado (1961) - Carlos
 Despedida de soltero (1961) - Miguel
 Abuelita Charlestón (1962) - Pierre
 El hombre del expreso de Oriente (1962)
 Héroes de blanco (1962)
 The Lovely Lola (1962) - Federico
 I tromboni di Fra Diavolo (1962) - Il colonnello Chamonis
 The Castilian (1963) - Abderramán
 40 años de novios (1963) - Valentín Pereira
 The Troublemaker (1963) - Felipe
 Los felices sesenta (1963) - Pablo
 Les Parias de la gloire (1964) - Albertini
 Apache Fury (1964)
 Doomed Fort (1964) - Paul Driscoll
 Destino: Barajas (1965)
 El puente de la ilusión (1965)
 Brilliant Future (1965) - Antonio
 Julieta engaña a Romeo (1965) - Roberto
 Desperate Mission (1965) - Robert Manning / Danny O'Connor / Agent Z-55
 Algunas lecciones de amor (1966) - Presentador / Juan
 El secreto del capitán O'Hara (1966) - Capitán Richard O'Hara
 Blueprint for a Massacre (1967) - Danny O'Connor / Agent Z-55
 Wanted (1967) - Martin Heywood
 Fistful of Diamonds (1967) - Clark
 Camerino Without a Folding Screen (1967)
 El rostro del asesino (1967) - Carlos
 Lola Colt (1967) - Larry Stern / El Diablo
 El halcón de Castilla (1967) - Don Diego de Mendoza
 Sangue chiama sangue (1968) - Padre Louis
 Quinto: non ammazzare (1969) - Sucre
 Matrimonios separados (1969) - Daniel
 ¡¡Se armó el belén!! (1970) - Don José
 Reverend's Colt (1970) - Fred
 Marianela (1972) - D. Carlos
 Sexy Cat (1973) - Mike Cash
 Las alegres vampiras de Vögel (1975) - Carlo
 Cría Cuervos (1976) - Nicolás Garontes
 Las camareras (1976) - Enrique
 Foul Play (1977) - Emigrante
 Hidden Pleasures (1977) - Ignacio
 Solos en la madrugada (1978) - Ramón Vidal
 Demasiado para Gálvez (1981) - El editor
 Law of Desire (1987) - El Cura
 The Rogues (1987) - Impresario teatrale
 Tu novia está loca (1988) - Padre de Amaia
 El aire de un crimen (1988) - Amaro
 Contra el viento (1990) - Antonio
 Ispanskaya aktrisa dlya russkogo ministra (1990) - Producer
 Bazar Viena (1990)
 La taberna fantástica (1991)
 La viuda del capitán Estrada (1991) - Mondéjar
 El día que nací yo (1991) - Rafael
 Un paraguas para tres (1992) - Padre de Daniel
 Tres palabras (1993) - Gordillo
 Boca a boca (1995) - Padre de Luci
 Mirada líquida (1996) - Padre de Antonio
 Esposados (1996, Short) - Sr. Guerrero
 Beyond the Garden (1996) - Alvaro Larra
 Arrayán (2001, TV Series) - D. Arturo Torres
 Pas si grave (2003) - Gabo
 C'est la vie, camarade! (2005, TV Movie) - Delgado

References

External links
 

1927 births
2015 deaths
Spanish male film actors
Male Spaghetti Western actors
20th-century Spanish male actors